The FIBA Polynesian Basketball Cup (FPC) is one of three new regional tournaments organized by FIBA Oceania. The tournament was played starting November 2018 for countries belonging to Polynesia sub-zone.

Tournament format
The six teams will be split into two pools of three playing in a round robin format. The top two teams in each group will qualify for the semi-finals (with the two bottom teams playing off) or if there are five teams or less; one pool will play a round-robin with the top four teams qualifying for semi-finals. The top three teams from the FPC will qualify for the Pacific Games.

Significance
According to FIBA in Oceania Executive Director David Crocker, one of the main reasons this tournament was created was to strengthen the level of competition within Oceania as well as the Pacific Games, ideally creating new national rivalries.

Men's tournaments

Summary

Medal table

Participating nations

Women's tournaments

Summary

Medal table

Participating nations

References

Polynesian Cup